Qiwllaqucha (Quechua qillwa, qiwlla, qiwiña gull, qucha lake, "gull lake", also spelled Quiullacocha) is a mountain in the Cordillera Central in the Andes of Peru which reaches a height of approximately . It is located in the Junín Region, Jauja Province, Canchayllo District.

References 

Mountains of Peru
Mountains of Junín Region